Ranjit Singh Cheema was a Vancouver-based Canadian gangster, drug trader and longtime under-world rival of notorious gangster and former Cheema disciple, Bindy Johal. He was involved in organized crime for over two-decades in Vancouver and also in cocaine trafficking.

Death
He was killed on 2 May 2012 in a targeted drive-by shooting, just three months after being released from prison for the attempted sale of 200 kilograms of heroin. According to crime journalist Kim Bolan and her police sources, "Since returning from a California prison three months ago, longtime Vancouver gangster Ranjit Singh Cheema had been trying to muscle his way back into the lucrative B.C. drug trade before he was gunned down Wednesday. In the process, Cheema disrespected some of his former underlings who have moved up in the business since the 43-year-old went to jail. Some close to Cheema, as well as police sources, believe recent disputes with old associates could have led to the gangland execution of the former south slope crime boss in front of his parents’ house on East 61st Avenue. "He was trying to step into his old role," one friend said. "He didn't realize that things have changed."

See also
 Indo-Canadian organized crime
 List of unsolved murders

References

2012 deaths
2012 murders in Canada
Canadian gangsters
Deaths by firearm in British Columbia
Indian emigrants to Canada
Indian gangsters
Male murder victims
Murdered Canadian gangsters
Murdered Indian gangsters
People from Vancouver
People murdered in British Columbia
Punjabi people
Punjabi-Canadian organized crime
Unsolved murders in Canada
People murdered by Canadian organized crime
Canadian people convicted of drug offences